The Irisbus Midway is a midibus produced by Iveco.

References

Midibuses
Iveco buses